Dimitri Henry is a United States Marine Corps lieutenant general who is the Director of Intelligence of the Joint Staff. He previously served as the Director of Intelligence of the United States Central Command and before that as the Director of Intelligence of the United States Marine Corps.

Military career 

Dimitri Henry enlisted in the Marine Corps in 1981 and attained the rank of SSgt before graduating from Texas A&M University in 1988 and being commissioned a 2ndLt.  

He served as the Commanding Officer, Co H, Marine Cryptologic Support Battalion, San Antonio, TX, from 2001-2004.  He went on to serve as Director Marine Corps Intelligence 2017 - 2019.

As a Lieutenant Colonel Henry commanded 1st Radio Battalion from 2006-2008 during which time the Radio battalion made two deployments to Iraq.  

In April 2022, Henry was nominated for promotion to lieutenant general and appointment as director for intelligence of the Joint Staff. His promotion ceremony was held on May 19, 2022.

References

External links

Year of birth missing (living people)
Living people
Place of birth missing (living people)
United States Marine Corps generals